Ekaterina Spasova Gecheva-Zaharieva (born 8 August 1975) is a Bulgarian politician who served as the Foreign Minister of Bulgaria 2017 to 2021. She was interim Deputy Prime Minister and Minister for Regional development from 2013.

Early life and education
Zaharieva was born in Pazardzhik in 1975. She became fluent in German at her local college, then attended the University of Plovdiv where she graduated in law. This was followed by a law master's degree.

Career

She worked as a lawyer until 2003. She then became a legal Advisor of the Ministry of Environment and Water. Zaharieva became the Director of Legal, Administrative and Regulatory Services in 2007.

Entering politics in 2009, she became the Minister of Regional Development to Rosen Plevneliev. When Plevneliev became President of Bulgaria, he chose her for the position of one of the Deputy Prime Ministers from March to May in 2013. She was interim deputy Prime Minister to Marin Raykov in the Bulgarian Cabinet.

In 2013 she was the Minister of Regional Development. From 18 December 2015 she served as Minister of Justice until 27 January 2017. She became the Foreign Minister of Bulgaria on 4 May 2017.

See also

List of foreign ministers in 2017
List of current foreign ministers

References

|-

1975 births
Living people
People from Pazardzhik
Foreign ministers of Bulgaria
Female foreign ministers
Women government ministers of Bulgaria
21st-century Bulgarian politicians
21st-century Bulgarian women politicians
Deputy prime ministers of Bulgaria
Bulgarian women diplomats
Female justice ministers
Justice ministers of Bulgaria